The 2020 Patna-Bhabua Intercity Express gang rape case involved a rape that occurred on 20 January 2020 on the Patna-Bhabua Intercity Express, near Bhabua Road railway station in Bihar.

The incident took place when a 22-year-old HIV positive woman was returning to her home after medical check up at Gaya.

Incident
The victim, a 22-year-old woman, was returning home on the night of 20 January 2020 after a check up, as she was undergoing treatment for HIV. She boarded at Gaya Junction railway station.

Two men, Birendra Prakash Singh and Dipak Singh, overpowered and raped her; they filmed the entire incident, which occurred as the train approached its last stop.

References

2020 crimes in India
Crime in Bihar
Gang rape in India
Incidents of violence against women
Rape in the 2020s
Violence against women in India
Indian people convicted of rape